Rastorfer Glacier is a glacier draining south from the Admiralty Mountains and entering upper Tucker Glacier just east of Homerun Range. Mapped by United States Geological Survey (USGS) from surveys and U.S. Navy aerial photography, 1960–63. Named by Advisory Committee on Antarctic Names (US-ACAN) for James R. Rastorfer, United States Antarctic Research Program (USARP) biologist at McMurdo Station in 1967-68 and Palmer Station in 1968–69.

Glaciers of Victoria Land
Borchgrevink Coast